Gordon Quan is a Chinese-American immigration lawyer, and former Houston City Council member. He was the second Asian American ever elected to Houston City Council. He was the first Asian American to ever be elected to an at-large position in the Houston City Council. Quan also once served as the Houston Mayor Pro Tem.

History
Quan was born in China, and he and his family later fled from China. Quan's father was William K.Y. Quan, a native of Guangdong province and a cofounder of the Asian American Bank of Houston. Since, at the time of Quan's birth, his father was a U.S. servicemember, Quan received U.S. citizenship by birth. Quan's younger brother is Rick Quan, a sportscaster in San Francisco. When Quan was growing up, his family was the only Asian American family on his block. He attended Milby High School.

Gordon Quan founded his immigration firm, Quan, Burdette & Perez PC, in early 1980. Quan began serving as City of Houston Mayor Pro-Tem in 2002. Quan once served as a Houston City Council member. He served in the at-large Position 2. Quan's final term was scheduled to end after the November 8, 2005 city council election; as he was term-limited, he was unable to run again. As a council member, Quan urged Asian Americans to become more involved in politics. Quan had been elected president of the board of directors of the Asian Pacific American Municipal Officials organization. After Hurricane Katrina occurred in 2005, Quan's office organized relief for Asian American businesses, community groups, professional associations, and churches. In 2005, Quan's firm was one of the largest immigration law firms in the U.S. In 2007, Quan's firm and Tindall & Foster PC merged, becoming Foster Quan LLP. In 2014, FosterQuan split, becoming Quan Law Group.

As of 2009, Quan lives in an area near Memorial Park. As of 2010 he lives in the Memorial area.

See also

 Sue Lovell
 Martha Wong
 History of the Chinese Americans in Houston

References

External links
/ Quan Law Group

Living people
American politicians of Chinese descent
Houston City Council members
Immigration lawyers
Asian-American people in Texas politics
Year of birth missing (living people)